Annette Fugmann-Heesing (born January 6, 1955) is a German lawyer and politician of the Social Democratic Party (SPD). Over the course of her career, she served as State Minister of Finance in two different states, Hesse and Berlin.

Political career
Fugmann-Heesing served as a member of the Abgeordnetenhaus of Berlin from 1999 until 2001.

Other activities

Corporate boards
 RAG AG, member of the supervisory board (since 2011)
 Landesbank Berlin Holding, member of the supervisory board (1996–2001)

Non-profit organizations
 Berlinische Galerie, member of the board of trustees (since 2008)
 Stiftung St. Matthäus, Evangelical Church in Berlin, Brandenburg and Silesian Upper Lusatia, member of the board of trustees
 University of Bielefeld, member of the university council (since 2008), member of the board of trustees (2003–2007)

References 

1955 births
Senators of Berlin
Living people